Estádio Francisco Novelletto Neto, better known as Estádio Passo D'Areia is a multi-use stadium located in Porto Alegre, Brazil. It is used mostly for football matches and hosts the home matches of Esporte Clube São José. The stadium has a maximum capacity of 16,000 people and was built in 1940. In 2020 the stadium was renamed after Francisco Novelletto Neto, who was president of Esporte Clube São José and the Federação Gaúcha de Futebol.

References

External links
EC São José stadium article 

Football venues in Rio Grande do Sul
Sports venues in Rio Grande do Sul
Esporte Clube São José